El Almendro Airport,  is an airport  north-northwest of Retiro, a town in the Maule Region of Chile.

An open-ended culvert crosses beneath the runway  from the south end and might pose a hazard for aircraft departing the centerline.

See also

Transport in Chile
List of airports in Chile

References

External links
OpenStreetMap - El Almendro
OurAirports - El Almendro
FallingRain - El Almendro Airport

Airports in Chile
Airports in Maule Region